Félix Allard (October 25, 1897 – September 17, 1974) was a lawyer, judge and political figure in Quebec. He represented Abitibi in the Legislative Assembly of Quebec from 1939 to 1944 as a Liberal.

He was born in Saint-François-du-Lac, Quebec, the son of Jules Allard and Berthe Toupin. Allard was educated at the Collège de Nicolet, the Université Laval at Montreal and the School of Management at Poughkeepsie, New York. He was admitted to the Quebec bar in 1922 and set up practice in Montreal, then, from 1924 to 1928, with Hector Authier at Amos and later on his own. From 1929 to 1936, he was deputy crown attorney for Abitibi district. He resigned his seat in the Quebec assembly after he was named judge in the circuit court for Abitibi, Rouyn-Noranda and Témiscamingue districts in 1944; he served until 1967. In 1945, he married Marie-Jeanne-Rita Hébert. Allard died in Sainte-Foy at the age of 76.

External links

References

1897 births
1974 deaths
Quebec Liberal Party MNAs
Judges in Quebec
People from Centre-du-Québec